The Central District of Ashkezar County is in Yazd province, Iran. At the National Census in 2006, its population was 22,200 in 6,037 households. The following census in 2011 counted 24,709 people in 7,330 households. At the latest census in 2016, the district had 28,019 inhabitants in 8,573 households.

References 

Ashkezar County

Districts of Yazd Province

Populated places in Yazd Province

Populated places in Ashkezar County